Marble Hill is a fourth-class city in central Bollinger County in Southeast Missouri, United States. Located at the intersection of State Highways 34 and 51, it is the largest city in Bollinger and serves as the county seat. The population was 1,388 at the 2020 census. The city was officially organized in July 1851 and is named after a marble-like rock.

Marble Hill is part of the Cape Girardeau−Jackson, MO-IL Metropolitan Statistical Area.

History

The area that would eventually become known as Marble Hill was established in 1842 as New California. Nine years later, it was renamed Dallas in 1851. As the area grew over the years, the First Baptist Church was built in 1856 near the oldest cemetery in Marble Hill. In 1862, the courthouse and town of Dallas was raided by Colonel S.D. Kitchen, along with 120 Confederate soldiers. Finally, in 1868, the name of the town was changed again, this time to Marble Hill, to prevent confusion with the already existing Dallas County.

A year after the name change, a man by the name of Eli Lutes laid out what would become known as Lutesville. Lutes offered  to the railroad for a depot location which would be used as a shipping and trading point. Disputes with leaders of Marble Hill persuaded the railroad to relocate their route through Lutesville instead.

In 1880, Will Mayfield College moved to Marble Hill from Smithville. It remained in operation there until its closing in 1934. In 1893, Wicecarver's Store was built across from the courthouse where the steps in front were formerly used for mounting horses and carriages. Between 1904 and 1905, the Mineral Well was dug on the courthouse square and was used until 1947–1948. The year 1932 marked the last passenger line on the Belmont Branch of the St. Louis & Iron Mountain Railroad. The railroad company ceased operations through Lutesville in 1973. In 1973, voters approved a measure to build what would become known as Twin City Airport.

It was suggested in 1985 that the towns of Marble Hill and Lutesville should merge. Lutesville, which had been founded in 1869 and later became the main business and shipping center for the area, merged with Marble Hill and maintained the name of Marble Hill because it was the current county seat. The portion of Marble Hill that was the former city of Lutesville is the portion southwest of Crooked Creek. Crooked Creek has flooded the town on many occasions.

Education 
Of adults 25 years of age and older in Marble Hill, 40.6% possess a high school diploma, 5.0% have a bachelor's degree, and 3.3% holds a post-graduate/professional degree as their highest educational attainment.

Public Schools
The Woodland R-IV School District serves the educational needs of most of the city's residents and nearby throughout central Bollinger County. According to the Missouri Department of Elementary & Secondary Education, there is one elementary school, one middle school, and one senior high school in the district. During the 2008–2009 school year, there was a total of 928 students and 79 certified staff members enrolled in the Woodland R-IV School District. The school colors are red and black and its mascot is the cardinal. Athletics at the school consist of boys' and girls' basketball and cross country; boys' baseball; girls' volleyball and softball; and cheerleading.
 Woodland Elementary School (K-04)
 Woodland Middle School (05-08)
 Woodland High School (09-12)

Public library
Marble Hill has a public library, the Bollinger County Library.

Geography
Marble Hill is located just north of the confluence of Hurricane Creek and Crooked Creek. Lutesville lies to the south across Crooked Creek. Missouri routes 34 and 51 pass through the community.

Climate 
Marble Hill has a humid subtropical climate (Köppen Cfa). Summers are hot and humid, while winters are cool.

Demographics

2010 census
As of the census of 2010, there were 1,477 people, 604 households, and 369 families residing in the city. The racial makeup of the city was 96.41% White, 1.02% Native American, 0.81% Asian, 0.34% from other races, and 1.42% from two or more races. Hispanic or Latino of any race were 1.76% of the population.

There were 604 households, of which 30.8% had children under the age of 18 living with them, 41.2% were married couples living together, 15.9% had a female householder with no husband present, 4.0% had a male householder with no wife present, and 38.9% were non-families. 33.6% of all households were made up of individuals, and 16% had someone living alone who was 65 years of age or older. The average household size was 2.32 and the average family size was 2.93.

The median age in the city was 39.8 years. 24.8% of residents were under the age of 18; 8.9% were between the ages of 18 and 24; 20.5% were from 25 to 44; 24.7% were from 45 to 64; and 20.9% were 65 years of age or older. The gender makeup of the city was 43.4% male and 56.6% female.

2000 census
As of the census of 2000, there were 1,502 people, 642 households, and 414 families residing in the city. The racial makeup of the city was 95.67% White, 0.13% African American, 1.40% Native American, 0.80% Asian, 0.13% from other races, and 1.86% from two or more races. Hispanic or Latino of any race were 0.80% of the population. Among the major first ancestries reported in Marble Hill are 16.2% German, 14.5% English, 14.4% Irish, 11.4% American, 5.4% Dutch, and 3.4% French.

There were 642 households, out of which 31.8% had children under the age of 18 living with them, 46.6% were married couples living together, 15.6% had a female householder with no husband present, and 35.5% were non-families. 32.6% of all households were made up of individuals, and 17.0% had someone living alone who was 65 years of age or older. The average household size was 2.31 and the average family size was 2.93.

In the city the population was spread out, with 27.2% under the age of 18, 9.1% from 18 to 24, 24.8% from 25 to 44, 20.0% from 45 to 64, and 18.9% who were 65 years of age or older. The median age was 36 years. For every 100 females, there were 83.4 males. For every 100 females age 18 and over, there were 78.8 males.

The median income for a household in the city was $22,163, and the median income for a family was $29,871. Males had a median income of $25,093 versus $16,161 for females. The per capita income for the city was $12,857. About 17.4% of families and 19.6% of the population were below the poverty line, including 24.4% of those under age 18 and 22.1% of those age 65 or over.

Government

City/Local
The City of Marble Hill is governed by Mayor Trey Wiginton and a four-member city council.

State
Marble Hill is a part of Missouri's 151st Legislative District and is currently represented by Representative
Herman Morse R-Dexter. In the Missouri Senate, State Senator Holly Rehder R-Scott City represents Marble Hill as part of Missouri's 27th Senatorial District.

Federal
Marble Hill is included in Missouri's 8th Congressional District and is currently represented in the U.S. House of Representatives by Jason T. Smith (R-Cape Girardeau).

See also
International Hat Company

References

External links
 City of Marble Hill, MO Website

Cities in Bollinger County, Missouri
County seats in Missouri
Cape Girardeau–Jackson metropolitan area
1842 establishments in Missouri
Cities in Missouri